Theorin is a Swedish surname. Notable people with the surname include:

Bernt Theorin, footballer
Daniel Theorin (born 1983), Swedish footballer
Iréne Theorin (born 1963), Swedish operatic soprano
Johan Theorin (born 1963), Swedish journalist and author
Maj Britt Theorin (1932–2021), Swedish politician

Swedish-language surnames